The women's 400 metres hurdles event at the 2017 Summer Universiade was held on 24 and 25 August at the Taipei Municipal Stadium.

Medalists

Results

Heats
Qualification: The winner of each heat (Q) and next 4 fastest (q) qualified for the final.

Final

References

400
2017